Medieval Greece refers to geographic components of the area historically and modernly known as Greece, during the Middle Ages.

These include:
Byzantine Greece (Early to High Middle Ages)
Northern Greece under the First Bulgarian Empire
various High Medieval Crusader states ("Frankish Greece") and Byzantine splinter states:
Latin Empire
Kingdom of Thessalonica
Principality of Achaea
Duchy of Athens
Despotate of Epirus
Despotate of the Morea
Northern Greece under the Second Bulgarian Empire (Ivan Asen II of Bulgaria)
Ottoman Greece (Late Middle Ages)

See also
Medieval Greek